Chris Kinloch (born 17 December 1988) is a Scotland 7s international rugby union player.

Rugby Union career

Amateur career

He played for Edinburgh Academicals when called up by Scotland for the Under 19 World Championship in 2007.

In the 2008-09 season, he was drafted to Edinburgh Academicals in the pro-player draft of that season.

The following season he was drafted instead to Currie. While with Currie, he won with team the Scottish Premiership in that 2009-10 season.

That same season he also played for Gael Force.

From 2010-13 he played for Loughborough Students.

Provincial and professional career

He played for Edinburgh District U18s.

He signed for Glasgow Warriors in 2008 after impressing in the friendly Warriors Challenge Vaquerin tournament. He made his Warriors competitive debut against Ulster at Stadium on 7 March 2009. He is Warrior No. 170.

He signed for Ealing Trailfinders in 2013.

International career

Kinloch was capped at Scotland U18 and Scotland U19 grades.

He played 4 times for the Scotland U20s.

He made his debut for the Scotland 7s in February 2007.

References

1988 births
Living people
Scottish rugby union players
Glasgow Warriors players
Currie RFC players
Edinburgh Academicals rugby union players
Gael Force players
Ealing Trailfinders Rugby Club players
Loughborough Students RUFC players
Scotland international rugby sevens players